The Bristol Red Sox baseball club was an American minor league baseball franchise. Based in Bristol, Connecticut, it was the Double-A Eastern League farm system affiliate of the Boston Red Sox for ten seasons (1973–82) and played at Muzzy Field.

Successor to original "PawSox"
The team was created during the 1972–73 offseason, when the parent Red Sox decided to move their Triple-A franchise, the Louisville Colonels, to Pawtucket, Rhode Island, home of the Sox' Eastern League farm team, the Pawtucket Red Sox, since 1970.

The Double-A PawSox' owner, Joe Buzas, selected Bristol as the site for his relocated EL franchise. The city had previously hosted the Bristol Owls of the Class B Colonial League in 1949–50 (the league disbanded on July 14, 1950) and the Tramps, Bellmakers and Woodchoppers of the Connecticut State League at the turn of the 20th century (1897; 1899–1901).

Nine winning seasons in ten years
Despite the presence of future Boston stars Jim Rice and Fred Lynn on the 1973 squad, the maiden season of the Bristol Red Sox was a losing one — but the next nine editions of the club sported over .500 records and won Eastern League titles in 1975, 1978 and 1981. Other future MLB or Red Sox stars who played for Bristol included Marty Barrett, Wade Boggs, Oil Can Boyd, Steve Crawford, Bo Díaz, Rich Gedman, Butch Hobson, Bruce Hurst, Steve Lyons, Al Nipper, Bob Stanley, Dave Stapleton, John Tudor and Ernie Whitt.

Managers included former Major Leaguers Stan Williams, Dick McAuliffe and John Kennedy, but the most successful Bristol skipper was veteran minor league player and skipper Tony Torchia, who piloted the club for its final five seasons, winning two championships.

Relocation to New Britain (1983–2015), Hartford (2016-present)
The franchise shifted to New Britain, Connecticut, in 1983, where it played for 33 years, the last 21 as the Rock Cats. The New Britain franchise, now a Colorado Rockies' affiliate, officially moved to nearby Hartford as the Yard Goats in 2016. Since 2003, the Red Sox' Eastern League affiliate has been the Portland Sea Dogs.

Annual record

References

External links
 Unofficial web site

Defunct Eastern League (1938–present) teams
Defunct sports teams in Connecticut
Boston Red Sox minor league affiliates
Bristol, Connecticut
Hartford Yard Goats
Professional baseball teams in Connecticut
1973 establishments in Connecticut
1982 disestablishments in Connecticut
Baseball teams established in 1973
Baseball teams disestablished in 1982